Glendon Theodore "Teddy" Campbell, Sr. (born February 24, 1975) is a gospel drummer & singer. He was the drummer on The Tonight Show with Jay Leno. He is the lead singer for the Soul Seekers.

Biography

Christian Youth M.B. of Chicago, is where Teddy Campbell's love of music, and learning to play the drums as a child, began.  For the past 7 years, Campbell was seen on The Tonight Show with Jay Leno as a member of the live house band. Campbell was the drummer for the newly formed Tonight Show band led by Rickey Minor.  He is now a drummer on American Idol.

Album credits 
 Kelly Clarkson – Thankful
 Deborah Cox – The Morning After
 George Duke – Duke
 Euge Groove – Play Date
 Herbie Hancock – Possibilities
 Paul Jackson Jr. – Still Small Voice
 Al Jarreau – All I Got
 Mary Mary – Incredible
 Mary Mary – Mary Mary
 Mary Mary – "Put a Little Love in Your Heart" from Stuart Little 2 soundtrack
 Stacie Orrico – Stacie Orrico
 Sisqó – Return of Dragon
 Rod Stewart – "When I Need You" from If We Fall in Love Tonight
 Kirk Whalum – Unconditional
 Stevie Wonder – A Time to Love
 So Amazing: An All-Star Tribute to Luther Vandross
 VH1 Divas Las Vegas

Tour experience
 The Backstreet Boys
 Christina Aguilera
 98 Degrees
 Maze featuring Frankie Beverly
 LSG (Gerald Levert, Keith Sweat, Johnny Gill)
 Dakota Moon
 Britney Spears
 Bette Midler
 Queen Latifah
 Boz Scaggs

Musical director experience
 Britney Spears
 98 Degrees
 Mary Mary
 Deborah Cox
 Kelly Price
 Ann Nesby (formerly of Sounds of Blackness)
 Michael Mathews Gospel Stage Play Sneaky starring Ali Woodson ( formerly of The Temptations )
 Howard Hewitt Fake Friends starring Shirley Murdock.

Television performances
 The Tonight Show with Jay Leno: The Backstreet Boys, Christina Aguilera, Michael Bolton, Yolanda Adams, Shaquille O'Neal, Heather Headley, Ashanti, P-Diddy
 Late Night with David Letterman: Christina Aguilera, The Backstreet Boys
 Saturday Night Live 2003: Christina Aguilera
 MTV TRL 2000: 98 Degrees
 The View: The Backstreet Boys
 The Today Show: 98 Degrees, The Backstreet Boys
 The Image Awards, 2002–2003: House Band
 The Essence Awards 2003: House Band
 The American Music Awards, 2000–2001: Christina Aguilera (2000), Yolanda Adams (2001)
 Soul Train Lady of Soul 2001: Mary Mary
 FOX presents Ali 50th Birthday Bash, 2001: Mariah Carey, Natalie Cole
 The Kennedy Center Honors, 2002: The Quincy Jones Quartet – Stevie Wonder & Ray Charles
 BET Walk of Fame Honoring Luther Vandross: Patti LaBelle, Luther Vandross, Chaka Khan
 VH1 Disco Ball 2003: House Band
 2001 Billboard Awards: All Star Performance "What's Goin On" N'sync, Gwen Stefani of (No Doubt), Nelly, Destiny's Child, Mary J. Blige
 2002 Billboard Awards: Tribute to Run DMC (w/ Steven Tyler/Joe Perry of Aerosmith) Ja Rule, Nelly, Busta Rhymes, Naughty By Nature, Queen Latifah
 Rosie O'Donnell, 1998, 2000–2001: Dakota Moon, Christina Aguilera, Mary Mary
 CBS, Home for The Holidays 2000-2001-2002: Josh Groban, Charlotte Church, Faith Hill, Destiny's Child, Kirk Franklin, Usher, Billy Gilman, Melissa Etheridge
 VH1 Divas Live, 2002: Celine Dion, Cher, Shakira, The Dixie Chicks, Mary J. Blige, Anastacia
 VH1 Diva Duets 2003: Celine Dion, Whitney Houston, Chaka Khan, Beyoncé, Ashanti, Mary J. Blige, Jewel, Lisa Marie Presley, Shania Twain, Stevie Wonder
 FOX's American Idol
 NBC's America's Got Talent
 2006 GRAMMY Awards with Herbie Hancock and Christina Aguilera
 The Ellen DeGeneres Show, 2006: Jamie Foxx
 Tonight Show with Jay Leno, 2006: Jamie Foxx
 Be on the lookout for Teddy on the upcoming FOX's "Celebrity Duets" show

Personal life
Teddy Campbell is married to Trecina "Tina" Atkins-Campbell of the highly acclaimed contemporary gospel duo, Mary Mary. They married in 2000. He has his eldest daughter (from a previous relationship)named Cierra. Together they have four children. Laiah Simone Campbell, Meela Jane Campbell, and Theodore (named after previous generations; he is also known as "TJ") and Santana Campbell.

References

External links
Official site
Teddy Campbell on Drummerworld
Official Yamaha artist page

American gospel musicians
1975 births
Living people
Place of birth missing (living people)
Musicians from Chicago
20th-century American drummers
American male drummers
21st-century American drummers
20th-century American male musicians
21st-century American male musicians
The Tonight Show Band members